Saw Lu Thinkhaya (1370s–1435) was the ruler of Toungoo from 1420 to 1435. He was first appointed governor of the frontier vassal state by King Minkhaung I of Ava in 1420. Following the succession crises at Ava, Thinkhaya declared independence in 1426. He seized up to Yamethin in 1428–29, and in an alliance with King Binnya Ran I of Hanthawaddy Pegu attempted to pick off Prome (Pyay) in 1430–31. But after Ava and Pegu separately reached a truce, Thinkhaya retreated to his home region, and may have lost control of the Yamethin region by 1434. Less than a year after his death in 1435, Toungoo became a vassal of Hanthawaddy.

Background
He was born Saw Lu, son of Gov. Letwe U-Shaung-Lwe of Mindon. He was likely born in the 1370s. He had at least one younger brother, who later became known as Gov. Nawrahta of Paungde and Tharrawaddy.

Governor of Toungoo
In 1420, King Minkhaung I of Ava (Inwa) appointed him governor of Toungoo (Taungoo), with the title of Thinkhaya. The king had been looking for a loyal and able governor for the restive region bordering the Hanthawaddy Kingdom (Pegu) with which Ava had been in a long drawn out war since 1385. At Toungoo, the new governor quickly brought law and order to the lawless region, with the help of his right-hand man Myat Hla, whom he appointed the chief magistrate of the region. He also patronized the Buddhist clergy, appointing the abbot of the Maha Wun monastery to be the chief abbot of the region. Four years into his term, Thinkhaya had completely turned around the region, bringing a degree of peace and prosperity.

Thinkhaya power grew further in 1425 when Ava entered a series of succession crises. That year, Queen Shin Bo-Me engineered the assassinations of kings Thihathu and Min Hla within three months of each other, and placed her lover Gov. Min Nyo of Kale on the throne in November 1425. The takeover was contested by Gov. Thado of Mohnyin who marched to Ava in February 1426. Initially, Thinkhaya, along with the rulers of other southern vassal states, agreed to support the new king at Ava. They even went to the Ava region to defend against the Mohnyin forces. But when the tide of war turned in favor of Mohnyin, Thinkhaya and other rulers retreated to their respective regions, taking their troops back with them. Ava defenses soon collapsed, and the Mohnyin forces entered the capital. Thado proclaimed himself king on 16 May 1426.

King of Toungoo

Break from Ava
At first, Thinkhaya was unsure of the new king. When Thado ordered the southern vassal rulers to Ava, he reluctantly went there, bringing a small retinue led by Myat Hla. At Ava, Thado tried to woo the vassal rulers for their support. Thinkhaya pledged support to the king but he and Myat Hla also assessed that Thado's army was not strong enough. Several vassal rulers apparently made the same assessment. Rulers of Toungoo, Taungdwin, Thissein, Yenantha, Pinle and Onbaung all revolted soon after they got back to their home region. According to the chronicle Toungoo Yazawin, Thinkhaya sent a formal letter to Thado, addressing the latter as "younger brother", and declaring is independence from Ava as well as his preparedness to go to war, if necessary.

Thinkhaya had an implicit ally in King Binnya Ran I of Hanthawaddy Pegu. Although Ran had signed a peace treaty with King Thihathu of Ava just three years earlier, the Hanthawaddy king decided to support the insurrections. Ran readily gave shelter to Thinkhaya's younger brother, Gov. Nawrahta of Paungde, who defected  January 1427 after his superior Gov. Min Maha of Prome sided with Thado. Ran seized the southernmost district of Prome, Tharrawaddy, and made Nawrahta governor of Tharrawaddy. Ava could not respond at all as it was facing more serious rebellions closer to home.

Expansion
Taking full advantage of Ava's troubles, Thinkhaya consolidated his power. In 1428–29, he annexed the five irrigated zones of the Yamethin region immediately to Toungoo's north, and even raided the districts towards the Irrawaddy such as Natmauk and Kyaukpadaung. He next entered into a formal alliance with Pegu by sending his younger daughter Saw Min Aung to Binnya Ran in a marriage of state. The allies eyed Prome, the southernmost region still loyal to Ava. (In response, Thado appointed his son Thihathu governor of Prome, replacing loyal but old Min Maha, in 1429.)

In 1430, Pegu and Toungoo jointly invaded Prome. Thinkhaya himself led a 5000-strong army, while Ran sent an army of equal size led by Smin Bayan, and a 5000-man naval forces led by Binnya Ein. The joint forces defeated the Prome defense forces outside the city. The invasion armies and the Pegu flotilla proceeded to lay siege to the fortified city. Given troubles closer to home, Ava was unwilling to fight a drawn out war in the south, and reluctantly asked for terms. Ava directly negotiated with Pegu as Thado considered Thinkhaya and Nawrahta rebels. Thado was prepared to cede Tharrawaddy to Pegu but wanted Nawrahta (now governor of Tharrawaddy) returned. After a long drawn out negotiation which came to near collapse a few times, Ava and Pegu reached an agreement that ceded Tharrawaddy to Pegu, and returned the rebellious Nawrahta to Ava. Thado also sent Princess Soe Min Wimala Dewi to Pegu to wed Ran in a marriage of state.

Last years
The Ava-Pegu treaty effectively scuttled Thinkhaya's expansion plans. He had to evacuate the Prome territory after the agreement was signed. It is unclear what Thinkhaya made of the agreement that sent his brother to Ava, or what his relationship with Ran continued to be. But without Pegu's explicit support, his position weakened. He appeared to have lost control of the Yamethin region, which by 1433–34 was controlled by an eastern Shan state.

To be sure, his control over Toungoo remained unchallenged. The peaceful and prosperous region continued to attract refugees from elsewhere. Nonetheless Thinkhaya remained highly concerned about his fiefdom. According to Toungoo Yazawin, when he built a new palace, he refused to install the white umbrella (Hti byu), a key part of the regalia of Burmese sovereigns, perhaps not to attract unwanted attention. History shows that his concerns were not unfounded: Toungoo formally became a vassal of Pegu within the year of his death.

He died in 1435 during a routine hunting trip. When his son-in-law Uzana seized the throne, his only son Saw Oo sought Ran's help. In 1436, Ran came up with an army to Toungoo, and installed Saw Oo as viceroy.

Notes

References

Bibliography
 
 
 
 

Ava dynasty
1370s births
1435 deaths